Ocean Prey is a mystery, and suspense novel by John Sandford released in 2021. The book reached number one on the New York Times Best Seller list. The novel is about two detectives who investigate the murder of three members of the Coast Guard. The novel is the 31st in the John Sandford Prey Series.

Plot
Lucas Davenport is the star character from the series of novels that Sandford wrote, called the Prey Series. Sandford also wrote a series of novels using a character named Virgil Flowers. In the novel Ocean Prey both characters Lucas Davenport and Virgil Flowers are brought together to investigate the murder of three members of the Coast Guard in Florida.

The drug smugglers who killed the Coast Guard officials hide their drugs at the bottom of the ocean and set their own boat on fire to hide any evidence. When the FBI does not make the case a priority, Flowers goes undercover to infiltrate a criminal operation. Virgil Flowers teams up with a female partner named Rae. After joining the gang of drug smugglers, Flowers goes diving in 100 feet of water to try to recover the drugs for the criminals.

Major themes
Underwater diving
Drug smuggling
Murder
Undercover operation

Reception
The book reached number one on the New York Times Best Seller list May 2, 2021.

The novel reached number one an Amazon's Most sold list April 24, 2021.

On May 11, 2021 the book was Apple Store's number 9 novel.

Ray Walsh from the Lansing State Journal called the book,  "A wild ride." Tim O'Connell from the Jacksonville Florida Times-Union said the book has witty banter and,  "Sandford always produces a good reading adventure... ".

Because of the diving themes Sandford one critic has said the book us too technical, and the story drags in the middle. The author concludes the book with a statement to readers: "If you are a diver, and you do find a serious error... I don’t want to hear about it..."

See also
The New York Times Fiction Best Sellers of 2021

References

External links
Ocean Prey at John Sandford
Ocean Prey at Penguin Random House

2021 American novels
American mystery novels
Suspense-fiction Adventure
American thriller novels
G. P. Putnam's Sons books